The Dennis Dart is a rear-engined single-decker midibus chassis that was introduced by Dennis Specialist Vehicles of Guildford, England in 1989, replacing the Dennis Domino. Initially built as a high-floor design, In 1996 the low-floor second generation Dennis Dart SLF was launched. In 2001, production of the Dart SLF passed to TransBus International, during which time it was sold as the TransBus Dart SLF; Alexander Dennis took over production in 2004, renaming the product as the Alexander Dennis Dart SLF.

More than 11,000 Darts were produced in total during a 19-year production run. Most were purchased by United Kingdom operators, although examples were sold in North America, Australia, Hong Kong and Singapore. In the United States, the Dart SLF, with Alexander ALX200 bodywork, was built and sold by Thomas Built Buses as the Thomas-Dennis Dart SLF 200.

The first generation Dart ceased production in 1998. Production of the Dart SLF continued until 2008, when it was replaced by the Alexander Dennis Enviro200.

First generation (high-floor)

The Dennis Dart was conceived when Hestair Group (owner of Dennis and Duple) decided to produce a bus between a minibus and a full-sized single-decker.

It was launched in 1988 and was originally offered with the Duple Dartline bodywork. It was 2.3m wide and was initially available in the length of 9.0m, but later available in lengths of 8.5m and 9.8m. It was powered by a Cummins 6BT engine and coupled to the Allison AT545 gearbox (the same engine and gearbox were also used in the MCW Metrorider, latterly the Optare MetroRider).

This model was sold to London Regional Transport and to some operators outside London. Soon after it was launched, Duple was sold to Plaxton and the Blackpool plant closed. Plaxton decided not to acquire the design rights of the Duple Dartline and it was sold to Carlyle Works, who continued producing the bodywork from 1991. Production passed to Marshall of Cambridge in 1992 who bodied five Darts to this design. In 1993, Marshall updated the design to the C36 and later, the C37.

In 1990, Wadham Stringer became the next builder to body the Dart with a body called the Portsdown, but it was sold in small numbers and replaced by the UVG Urbanstar in 1995. In the same year, Wright bodied the Dart with the Handybus. In early 1991, Plaxton launched the Pointer (which was initially designated as Reeve Burgess Pointer as it was built at Reeve Burgess's plant, until later in the same year when it was transferred to Plaxton's Scarborough plant). Later in 1991, East Lancs bodied the Dart with its EL2000. In the latter half of 1991, Alexander launched the Dash. Another contender entering the market at the same time was the Northern Counties Paladin. Initially, it was built with a design of a barrel shaped windscreen with quarterlights (which were mainly sold to Warrington Borough Transport), later models had a deep double-curvature two-piece windscreen. It was phased out when Plaxton bought Northern Counties in 1995.

In 1993, Southampton Citybus purchased 16 Dart 9SDL buses adapted to use natural gas, the cylinders being mounted in a pod on the roof.

As the low-floor single-decker buses became more popular in late 1990s, orders for standard-floor Dart dropped heavily and production ceased in 1998, with the final five delivered to Jersey Motor Transport. A total of 3,470 first generation Darts were produced.

Second generation (Dart SLF)

In 1996, Dennis launched a low-floor version of the Dart known as the Dart SLF, with the letters SLF standing for Super Low Floor in reference to the new low-floor design. It was 2.4m wide and initially offered in lengths of 9.2m, 10m and 10.6m, with air suspension introduced in place of the taper leaf used in the original design. The driveline of the step-entrance Dart was retained, although some early examples were fitted with Eaton manual transmission.

It was initially offered with the low floor version of the Pointer bodywork (which was notable for being wider), replaced by the updated Pointer 2 in 1997. It was also offered with a wide variety of bodies, namely the East Lancs Spryte, UVG Urbanstar (later renamed as the Caetano Compass; replaced by the Nimbus in 1999), the Wright Crusader, Alexander ALX200 (discontinued in 2001 with the formation of TransBus International and being replaced by the Pointer 2), Marshall Capital (developed from the C37; later built by MCV), Caetano Nimbus and MCV Evolution (since 2005 - a further evolution of the Marshall bodywork).

With the move to Euro III emissions in October 2001, the new Cummins ISBe engine was launched, with the 4-cylinder 3.9-litre model being used in all lengths except the 11.3m version, which uses the more powerful 6-cylinder, 5.9-litre version. The Cummins ISBe Euro IV engine became available on the Dart SLF chassis since late 2006. In 2007 the Dennis Dart SLF was superseded by the Alexander Dennis Enviro200. The last Alexander Dennis Dart SLF was delivered to Park Island Transport of Hong Kong in March 2008. A total of 9,191 Dart SLFs were produced, making it one of the most successful buses of all time.

Dart SPD

In 1997, the Dart SPD (short for Super Pointer Dart) was launched with a length of 11.3m (about the same length as a long Leyland National), typically seating 40 to 44 passengers. The Dart SPD was launched to compete with full-size buses such as the Volvo B10BLE and Scania L94UB, while retaining the more lightweight construction of the basic Dart SLF. The Dart SPD has a more powerful engine and a more heavy duty Allison World Series B300R gearbox than the Dart SLF, but also with an option of a Voith gearbox. Originally offered only with Plaxton Pointer 2 bodywork (hence the 'P' in the name), this larger bus was later offered with other bodywork such as the East Lancs Myllennium, the Alexander ALX200 and a few have also been bodied by Marshall. At least 230 Dart SPDs were produced.

Dart MPD

In 1998, the Dart MPD (short for Mini Pointer Dart) was launched. At 8.8m long, the Dart MPD was a model reminiscent of the original 8.5m Darts; it was launched to compete with newly emerging shorter midibuses such as the Optare Solo. The Dart MPD typically seated 23 to 29 passengers, and was available in both provincial and London specifications. As with the Dart SPD, the MPD was launched initially with only the Plaxton Pointer 2 bodywork, although other bodies became available later on.

Narrow width Dart SLF

In 2002, TransBus launched a narrower-width variant of the Dart SLF at the request of bus operators in the Channel Islands of Guernsey and then Jersey, who replaced the majority of their fleets with slightly narrower Darts designed to comply with the islands' vehicle size restrictions, sporting adapted versions of existing East Lancs Myllennium and Caetano Nimbus bodies respectively. Further examples have since joined them and small numbers of similar buses have entered service with other operators around the UK. Gibraltar also has a fleet of these narrower buses. The last ones entered service in summer 2007 in Gibraltar.

Thomas-Dennis Dart SLF 200
The Dennis Dart SLF, with Alexander ALX200 bodywork, was constructed in the United States for the North American market by Thomas Built Buses, being sold as the Thomas-Dennis Dart SLF 200 in reference to both the chassis and bodywork.

Exports
Although primarily sold in the United Kingdom, some were sold overseas:

Australia
ACTION (25), Brisbane Bus Lines (3), Invicta Bus Services (27) and Transperth (2)

Canada
In British Columbia, provincial operator BC Transit took delivery of 90 Dart SLFs with Plaxton Pointer 2 bodies from 1999 to 2001 for services in the resort municipality of Whistler and its other transit system companies in the province.

Hong Kong & Macau

In Hong Kong, New World First Bus purchased 76, Kowloon Motor Bus  60, Citybus 30, New Lantao Bus 3, Park Island Transport 15 and Discovery Bay Buses 5. They were delivered between 1994 and 1999. Most were retired in 2014 - 2017.

In Macau, Transmac took delivery of ten dual-door and air-conditioned Pointer-bodied Darts in January 1996.

Singapore
In Singapore, Singapore Bus Service purchased 10 Duple Metsec bodied Darts in 1994 for smaller routes (M1, M2, M4 and 183). All the buses were retired in 2010 and replaced by Volvo B10Ms. Several private operators uses Dennis Darts (including SLF), those are being scrapped by 2019.

Earlier front-engined Dart

The Dart name was originally applied to a front-engined single-decker bus chassis produced by Dennis between 1978 and 1980. However, the front-engined Dart remained unsuccessful, with only two examples produced, both with Marshall bodywork. The first was built for the Iraqi University and exported to Baghdad in 1978; the second was produced for the West Midlands Fire Service as a mobile command centre in 1980.

References

External links

Dennis buses
Alexander Dennis buses
Vehicles introduced in 1989
Bus chassis
Buses of the United Kingdom
Buses of the United States
Full-size buses
Low-entry buses
Midibuses
Single-deck buses